Hrádek (meaning small fort in Czech) may refer to places in the Czech Republic:

Hrádek (Frýdek-Místek District), a municipality and village in the Moravian-Silesian Region
Hrádek (Hradec Králové District), a municipality and village in the Hradec Králové Region
Hrádek u Nechanic, a castle
Hrádek (Klatovy District), a municipality and village in the Plzeň Region
Hrádek (Rokycany District), a town in the Plzeň Region
Hrádek (Ústí nad Orlicí District), a municipality and village in the Pardubice Region
Hrádek (Znojmo District), a municipality and village in the South Moravian Region
Hrádek nad Nisou, a town in the Liberec Region
Červený Hrádek, a municipality and village in the South Bohemian Region
Nový Hrádek, a market town in the Hradec Králové Region
Starosedlský Hrádek, a municipality and village in the Central Bohemian Region